Nina Andreyevna Korobkova (born 14 December 1926) was a Soviet rower who won eight European titles in the eights event between 1955 and 1962. For these achievements she was awarded the Order of the Badge of Honour.

References

1926 births
Possibly living people
Russian female rowers
Soviet female rowers
European Rowing Championships medalists